Kalateh-ye Mian Rud may refer to:
 Kalateh-ye Now, Arabkhaneh
 Mian Rud, South Khorasan